Mickey's Farm is a Canadian children's television series made for preschoolers and children, which is a mix of live action, animation and original music. The show is a remake of the animated made for television film & produced by Best Boy Entertainment in St. John's, Newfoundland and airs on The Pet Network in Canada and in the U.S. on the Qubo channel in 2014 and the Trinity Broadcasting Network-owned Smile of a Child children's network (now known as Smile), which picked up the U.S. rights to the show in 2012.

Premise
Mickey, a new farm dog, has just moved from the city to the farm with his best friend, Megan. Each episode follows Mickey as he experiences new things on the farm and sometimes gets himself into troublesome situations. With the help of Megan, his friends Guy the Goat and Fiona the Ferret and their Magic Book, Mickey resolves his problems and learns something new. Each episode ends with an original song, which reiterates new things learned. The show is intended to motivate children to explore new things, ask questions, problem-solve and make new friends.

Major characters
 Mickey the Sheepdog is a real Shetland Sheepdog who lives on a farm, has a love for adventure and is very curious. His best friend is Megan. Mickey was voiced by Peter MacDonald in the first two seasons and Erin Mackey for the rest of the series.
 Megan is Mickey's 14-year-old best friend who goes to school near the farm. Everyday after school, she helps Mickey answer questions and sort out problems that are different. Megan was played by Jessica Croucher in the first two seasons and Hannah Wadman-Scanlan for the rest of the series.
 Guy the Goat is a British goat who lives on the farm and is friends with Mickey and Megan. His agreeable character is wise and offers a matter-of-fact type interpretation. Guy is voiced by Charles Tomlinson, the only cast member who is credited in every episode.
 Fiona the Ferret is a likable ferret who also lives on the farm and is friends with Mickey and Megan. Her enthusiastic character is always offering creative and helpful suggestions. Fiona was voiced by Katherine Hatcher in the first season and Hannah Wadman-Scanlan for the rest of the series.
 Sunny the Sun (the sun) is an ever-present maternal character who is always watching over the farm and narrates the show. Sunny was voiced by Rhona Buchar in the first season and Allison White (who became the show's director in the second season) for the rest of the series.

Production
The show was originally developed in association with The Pet Network, designed for children ages 2–6. All episodes are 11 minutes in length, with two episodes usually shown within a 30-minute time slot when aired on TV. Season 1 (26 episodes) was produced in 2009 and was directed by Christian Sparkes and was produced by Ed Martin, who was also the show's executive producer. Season one began airing on The Pet Network in October 2009 and Qubo in December 2014. Season 2 (39 episodes, the most in its run) was produced in 2010 and was directed by Allison White. Season two began airing on The Pet Network in 2010 and Qubo in late-December 2014. Seasons 3, 4 and 5 (26 episodes each) were produced and began airing in 2011, 2012 and 2013, respectively. Each episode includes an original score created by Jeremy Rice.

Episodes

References

External links
 Mickey: Everyone's Best Friend Trailer
 Mickey - The Pet Network
 Best Boy Entertainment
 
 

Canadian children's fantasy television series
Television shows set in Newfoundland and Labrador
Television shows filmed in St. John's, Newfoundland and Labrador
2009 Canadian television series debuts
2013 Canadian television series endings
2000s Canadian children's television series
2010s Canadian children's television series
Canadian television series with live action and animation
Canadian preschool education television series
Television series about teenagers
Television shows about dogs